Bony is an Australian television series made in 1992. The series of 13 episodes followed on from a telemovie made in 1990. The series was criticised for casting a white man (Cameron Daddo) as the title character Detective David John "Bony" Bonaparte, under the tutelage of "Uncle Albert", an elderly Aborigine played by Burnum Burnum. Bony was supposed to be a descendant of the Bony character created by Arthur Upfield in dozens of novels from the late 1920s until his death in 1964.

Cast
 Cameron Daddo as Detective David John "Bony" Bonaparte
 Burnum Burnum as "Uncle Albert" Harris
 Christian Kohlund as Detective Sergeant Frank Fisher
 Terence Cooper as Inspector Leo Vincetti
 Mandy Bowden as Constable Bev Miles

Pilot

The pilot film to the series aired in 1990. It concerns Bony investigating an attempted rape allegation.

See also
 Boney (TV series)

References

External links

Blackwater Trail at IMDb

Australian television films
1990s Australian drama television series
1992 Australian television series debuts
Television shows based on Australian novels
1990s Australian crime television series